The Hogan Family (originally titled Valerie and later Valerie's Family) is an American sitcom television series that began airing on NBC on March 1, 1986, and finished its run on CBS on July 20, 1991, for a total of six seasons. It was produced in association with Lorimar Productions (1986), Lorimar-Telepictures (1986–1988), and Lorimar Television (1988–1991).

Under the title Valerie, the show originally centered around Valerie Harper in the title role as a mother trying to juggle her career and raising three sons with an absent airline pilot husband. After the first two seasons, Harper was replaced, following contractual disputes over her salary. Her character was killed at the start of season three and Sandy Duncan joined the cast as Valerie's sister-in-law and the boys' aunt. The series was retitled Valerie's Family, and for seasons four through six it was retitled The Hogan Family.

Cast 
 Valerie Harper as Valerie Hogan (seasons 1–2)
 Sandy Duncan as Sandy Hogan (seasons 3–6), replaced Valerie as the mother figure of the family.
 Jason Bateman as David Hogan
 Danny Ponce as Willie Hogan
 Jeremy Licht as Mark Hogan
 Josh Taylor as Michael Hogan
 Christine Ebersole as Barbara Goodwin (season 1)
 Judith Kahan as Annie Steck (season 2)
 Edie McClurg as Mrs. Patty Poole (seasons 2–6)
 Tom Hodges as Rich (seasons 2–5, guest appearance in season 6)
 Steve Witting as Burt Weems (seasons 3–6; previously made guest appearances in season 2)
 Willard Scott as Peter Poole (seasons 3–4)
 Angela Lee as Brenda Walker (seasons 5–6)
 Josie Bissett as Cara Eisenberg (seasons 5–6)
 John Hillerman as Lloyd Hogan (season 6)

Episodes

Early seasons
Like most American sitcoms in the 1980s, the series sometimes dealt with moral conflicts, but not in a heavy-handed fashion. In the very special episode "Bad Timing", which first aired February 7, 1987, David and a former girlfriend debate whether to have sex. The episode featured the first use of the word condom on a prime time television program.

After a modest start in the ratings that was countered by critical success, Valerie had begun to show growth in the Nielsens by the end of the 1986–87 season. Its most significant ratings jump occurred after its moving to Mondays at 8:30/7:30c in March 1987, following ALF. NBC renewed the series for a third season in May. In light of the show's success, Harper and her husband, Tony Cacciotti, approached their producers and NBC about per-episode salary increases and a larger cut of future syndication revenue. When all of the couple's requests were refused, Harper and Cacciotti walked out on Valerie. Harper had prior history in this situation, as she staged a walkout in 1975 following the first season of her hit series Rhoda (and its parent series, The Mary Tyler Moore Show) which successfully resulted in a pay increase.

The couple continued to negotiate with Miller-Boyett Productions, Lorimar-Telepictures and NBC during the next few months as the behind-the-scenes struggle became well publicized. NBC programming chief Brandon Tartikoff, who was unhappy with the feud, publicly stated that he would replace Harper with another actress if the fighting did not cease. Tartikoff suggested Sandy Duncan as a replacement to Miller and Boyett, who both sided with the network chief in this possible casting decision. Duncan had recently signed a contract with NBC for a starring vehicle, and Tartikoff felt that this would be the best opportunity for her to make use of it. Though the NBC case was dismissed, Harper and Cacciotti won their trial against Lorimar on September 16, 1988, and were awarded $1.82 million in damages; which they both later donated to various charities. Harper left the show and was replaced by Duncan as the female lead.

Network switch

In 1990, after spending three of the last four years on Monday nights at 8:30/7:30 (having been on Sundays before that), NBC opted not to respond to an agreement made with Lorimar insisting that the network had to exercise renewal options on the series before April 1. Despite the series still sporting decent ratings, NBC stated that it chose not to renew The Hogan Family "because of the strength of our current development." The show was then picked up by CBS for the sixth and final season.

Production

Theme music and presentation
The theme song, "Together Through the Years", was performed by Roberta Flack and composed by Charles Fox. The lyrics were written by Stephen Geyer.

Syndication 
The Hogan Family aired in U.S. syndication on local television stations, from September 1990 until Summer 1998. From August 1998 until August 1999, startup broadcast network PAX TV aired reruns of the series weekdays at 4/3c.

ABC Family previously held the U.S. syndication rights to the program and had aired episodes twice daily for five weeks from September 25 (2005?) until October 27, 2006. It had discontinued running the show since then.

In Canada, the Crossroads Television System held the Canadian syndication rights and began airing the show Wednesday nights. It discontinued airing the show in 2011.

The Hogan Family title was used for syndicated showings of almost all episodes, including those originally broadcast as Valerie or Valerie's Family. Also, the theme was shortened in the opening credits when the show was in syndication. During the Valerie seasons, the title sequence becomes slow motion at the scene where Mike and the boys begin to tackle Valerie in their football game. For the third-season episodes, the title shot from seasons four and five is used for reruns, where The Hogan Family is displayed over the Hogans carrying their picnic items through the park. This deleted the scene where Sandy runs out to the baseball diamond to try and get the bases unloaded. The latter was where the Valerie's Family title was shown on NBC airings, with The Hogans appearing over the park-walking scene.

Initially the only episode to retain the Valerie title in syndication was "Bad Timing" (February 8, 1987), which also kept the original parental advisory disclaimer from NBC. But by 2016 the first two seasons went back to their Valerie title. Season three however stayed as The Hogan Family but did not include the Jason Bateman Hockey sequence of season four.

In 2016, Antenna TV announced that they would air the series in 2017. The Christmas episode was the first to air on the network on December 16, during a marathon of holiday-themed episodes from Antenna TV programs throughout the month, before the show officially joined the lineup on January 2, 2018.

The series began airing on Rewind TV on September 1, 2021, after leaving Antenna TV.

In the United Kingdom, the series was shown on BBC1 from 1987 to 1992.

In New Zealand, the series was shown on TVNZ.

See also
The Conners, the revamped reboot of Roseanne after Roseanne Barr was fired.

References

External links 

The Hogan Family at Sitcom Online

1980s American sitcoms
1986 American television series debuts
1990s American sitcoms
1991 American television series endings
American television series revived after cancellation
CBS original programming
English-language television shows
Fictional quintets
NBC original programming
Salary controversies in television
Television series about families
Television series about widowhood
Television series by Lorimar-Telepictures
Television series by Lorimar Television
Television shows set in Cook County, Illinois